Sarah Stewart (born 1939) is an American author of children's books.  She is married to David Small and lives in a manor house in Mendon, Michigan.

Works 
The Money Tree, with David Small (illustrator), Farrar, Straus and Giroux, 1994.
The Library with David Small (illustrator), Farrar, Straus and Giroux, 1995.
The Gardener with David Small (illustrator), Farrar, Straus and Giroux, New York, 1997.
The Journey, with David Small (illustrator), Farrar, Straus and Giroux 2001.  A "Publishers Weekly" and "School Library Journal" Best Book of the Year. 
The Friend, with David Small (illustrator), Farrar, Straus and Giroux, 2004.
The Quiet Place, with David Small (illustrator), Farrar, Straus and Giroux, 2012.
This Book of Mine, with David Small (illustrator), Farrar, Straus and Giroux, 2019.

Awards
1998 Caldecott Honor for The Gardener
2007 Michigan Author Award

References

External links

 

Living people
American children's writers
Writers from Michigan
1939 births
People from Mendon, Michigan
Place of birth missing (living people)